Auf leisen Sohlen (German for "Silent Footsteps") is a compilation by Sky Records of works by German keyboardist Hans-Joachim Roedelius, best known for his work with Cluster, Harmonia, and Aquarello.  It is subtitled Das Beste von H. J. Roedelius (1978 - 1982) and includes tracks from seven of the eight albums he recorded for Sky Records during that period.  All music included in this collection was composed by Hans-Joachim Roedelius.

Auf leisen Sohlen was originally released as a vinyl LP by Sky Records in 1984.  It was reissued on CD by Sky Records in 1994.

Track listing 
 "Johanneslust" - 4:50 (from: "Durch die Wüste", 1978)
 "Dein Antlitz" - 3:50 (from: "Lustwandel", 1981)
 "Lustwandel" - 3:52 (from: "Lustwandel", 1981)
 "Flieg', Vogel, Fliege" - 2:33 (from: "Flieg' Vogel fliege", 1982)
 "Auf und Davon" - 4:36 (from: "Flieg' Vogel fliege", 1982)
 "Herold" - 3:57 (from: "Selbstportrait", 1979)
 "Auf leisen Sohlen" - 3:47 (from: "Wenn der Südwind Weht", 1981)
 "Gewiss" - 4:42 (from: "Selbstportrait II", 1980)
 "Besucher Im Traum" - 3:51 (from: "Offene Türen", 1982)
 "Auf der Höhe" - 3:59 (from: "Offene Türen", 1982)

Personnel 
 Hans-Joachim Roedelius - Producer, all titles by, performer
 Conny Plank - Producer ("Johanneslust")
 Peter Baumann - Producer ("Dein Antlitz" and "Lustwandel")
 Ragnit von Mosch - Cover Painting

Notes

References 
 Album liner Notes

1984 compilation albums
Hans-Joachim Roedelius albums